Fathis Handhuvaru is a 1997 Maldivian horror film directed by Easa Shareef. Produced by Aslam Rasheed under Slam Studio, the film stars Reeko Moosa Manik and Niuma Mohamed in pivotal roles. The film is celebrated as the most successful and watched Maldivian film release and was considered to be the "all time favorite" Maldivian film.

Plot
A group of friends go on a picnic to an island. Within the group, Zoona (Niuma Mohamed) is instantly attracted to Jina (Reeko Moosa Manik). The first night, she woke up at midnight and enjoys walking on the beach herself. A ghost disguised as Jina accompanies the unsuspecting Zoona. When she returns home, Jina was already sleeping at the hut. The following night, they spend time together at beach, take photos together and share an intimate moment. Next morning, she was revealed by a friend that she was alone on the beach. Suspecting strange events, that night she took a friend with her and was startled when her friend doesn't see Jina.

Zoona returns to Malé and discovers herself pregnant with the ghost's child. She gives birth to a girl, Jenny, after an unusually easy labor. Jina demands to resettle Zoona and Jenny in his world with his family which Zoona condemned. However, she agreed to hand over Jenny once she is strong and fit. Fearing of losing her child, Zoona ties an amulet over her neck so Jina cannot touch Jenny which leads Jina to warn Zoona that he will return on Jenny's fifth birthday. After five years, Zoona who is now married to Ihusan (Ali Shameel) is distressed with Jina's warning. They go on family trip and Zoona is distraught on learning that they lands to the same island where she met Jina for the first time. While swimming, Jenny accidentally loses the amulet. That night, Jenny goes missing and Zoona finds her with Jina. The whole group searches for Jenny in the sea and forest while Jenny leaves with her father to return after few years.

Five years later, Zoona and Ihusan is now blessed with a boy, Saajid. The family decided to visit an island to spend holiday but due to the bad weather and rough sea, they are yet again forced to land on the same island which now is inhabited. On the island, they are being followed by Jenny while Jina fails to debauch Zoona. One night, during a social gathering Zoona lures a trap to burn Jina. Afterwards, Zoona convinced Ihusan to welcome Jenny into their family since she is an orphan. To avoid suspicion Jenny is strained from calling Zoona mother and she works as a maid in the house. To Zoona's disbelief, Jina shows up alive and reveals that ghosts cannot be incinerated.

Several disputes arises between Zoona and Jina regarding her unfair treatment towards. Saajid falls very sick and Zoona blames it on Jina. However, he shows up with medication which Zoona refused to take. One night, when Saajid was admitted at hospital, Jina disguised as Ihusan have sex with her. Zoona, aware of his betrayal too late, brings a spell-maker who ultimatum has one of the two options; Either Jenny and Jina separates or Zoona dies. Jina exposes Ihusan's true identity that he has a wife and two kids elsewhere to Zoona which she refused to believe. One last time, Jina offered Zoona to migrate to his world which she declines. Saajid dies and Ihusan attempted to make a spell on Jenny believing she is the root of all problems. Jina threatens Zoona that he will take Jenny with him and he once more will impregnate her, making her give birth to a ghost rather than a human after suffering a strenuous labor. Jina murders the spell-maker and come to take Jenny with him.

On their departure, Zoona creates a scene blaming Saajid's death on Jina. Ihusan joins them and was surprised to see Jina and Jenny. Jina reveals the true identity of Jenny, their secret affair and informs about Zoona's next child. As soon as they leave she has a swift pregnancy and delivers an undefined-shaped ghost. Ihusan and Zoona discuss about the fate of their relationship. He agrees to take her in his life only if she gets rid of her new-born child. A breakout happens and is revealed that Ihusan is being killed by her child. It later changes its form to its true shape freaking out Zoona.

Cast 
 Reeko Moosa Manik as Jina
 Niuma Mohamed as Zoona
 Ali Shameel as Ihusan
 Arifa Ibrahim as Zoona's mother
 Mariyam Sheleen as Jenny / Sajidh
Hawwa Enee as Jenny

Soundtrack

Reception
The film received positive response from critics. Ahmed Nadheem from Haveeru wrote: "Fathis Handhuvaru is easily the best Maldivian horror film released in Maldivian Cinema. The spine-chilling memory of the film will never be able to leave the mind of cinema-goers. The scene where Jinaa sparkles a lightning from his eyes and shatters the window is a "classic shot" and will be long-remembered. He also appreciated with the inclusion of a "male ghost" in lead role which is featured in a Maldivian film for the first time.

Accolades

Prequel

Dark Rain Entertainment had announced plans to make a prequel called Fathis Handhuvaruge Feshun 3D which tells of Jina and his journey till he meets Zoona. Yoosuf Shafeeu replaced Reeko Moosa Manik as Jina while Fathimath Fareela, Ahmed Nimal, Ahmed Saeed and Ahmed Faisal were included to the cast. The film was marketed as being the first 3D release for a Maldivian film and the first release derived from spin-off. However, upon release the film received generally negative reviews from critics.

References

1997 films
1997 horror films
Maldivian horror films